Algona may refer to:
Algona, Iowa, a city in Kossuth County, Iowa
Algona, Washington, a city in King County, Washington
Algona College, a former institution in Iowa (1869–1875)
Algona Road, in Tasmania

See also 
 Algoma (disambiguation)